Blink is a song produced by Mark Lister and released as a single by Pop Idol contestant Rosie Ribbons in 2002. The single peaked at number 12 in the United Kingdom.

Track listing
"Blink" (radio edit) - 3:09
"Blink" (Rishi Rich "Urban Rose" remix) - 4:10
"Colours" - 4:05
"Blink" (music video)

Charts

References

2002 singles
Rosie Ribbons songs
2002 songs
Australian hip hop songs